Phyllodocida is an order of polychaete worms in the subclass Aciculata. These worms are mostly marine, though some are found in brackish water. Most are active benthic creatures, moving over the surface or burrowing in sediments, or living in cracks and crevices in bedrock. A few construct tubes in which they live and some are pelagic, swimming through the water column. There are estimated to be more than 4,600 accepted species in the order.

Characteristics
Phyllodocida are segmented worms and range in size from a few millimetres long to over a metre. Each segment bears a pair of paddle-like parapodia. The prostomium generally has one or two pairs of eyes, a dorsal pair of antennae, a ventral pair of sensory palps and a pair of organs on the neck. The peristomium is a ring, often hidden dorsally by the prostomium and the first segment. There is a muscular proboscis with one or more pairs of jaws. The next few segments tend to differ from those further back in having enlarged dorsal and ventral cirri (fine appendages) and reduced parapodial lobes and chaetae (bristles). Some species have appendages with specialised functions but most have many segments that are similar to each other but which vary in size and shape along the length of the body without abrupt changes in the chaetae and parapodia from one to the next.

Biology
Worms in this order are generally predators or scavengers.

Phylogenetic relationships
The three main subgroups are Aphroditiformia, Glyceriformia and Nereidiformia. The Aphroditiformia are characterised by the presence of elytrae or scales on alternating segments. The Glyceriformia are characterised by the presence of unique cone-shaped and ringed prostomiums. The Nereidiformia are more problematic, having no universally distinguishing common features. There is agreement on the monophyly of a group including the Hesionidae, Nereididae and Chrysopetalidae families but opinions differ about Pilargidae, and molecular and morphological studies continue.

Families
Recognised families:

Suborder Aphroditiformia 
Superfamily Aphroditoidea
Acoetidae
Aphroditidae
Eulepethidae
Pholoidae
Polynoidae
Sigalionidae
Superfamily Chrysopetalacea
Chrysopetalidae
Superfamily Pisionacea
Pisionidae
Suborder Glyceriformia 
Glyceridae
Goniadidae
Lacydoniidae
Paralacydoniidae
Suborder Nereidiformia 
Antonbruuniidae
Hesionidae
Nereidae
Pilargidae
Syllidae
Suborder Phyllodocida incertae sedis 
Iospilidae
Nephtyidae
Sphaerodoridae
Tomopteridae
Typhloscolecidae
Yndolaciidae
Suborder Phyllodociformia 
Alciopidae
Lopadorhynchidae
Phyllodocidae
Pontodoridae 
Incertae sedis
Nautiliniellidae

References

External links

 
Protostome orders
Annelid orders